Lake Desire, also called Echo Lake, is an unimproved watershed  southeast of Renton, Washington in the United States. It is a small part of the Maple Heights-Lake Desire, Washington area, 45 minutes east of downtown Seattle. A public boat launch and fishing dock is located to the north of the lake but does require a vehicle use permit from the Washington Department of Fish and Wildlife. On the southeast border of the lake, a  forested park and wetland area has been allocated by the Washington Wildlife and Recreation Program (WWRP).

Recreation 
 Fishing is managed as a  mixed species fishery. Active species include pumpkinseed, largemouth bass, yellow perch, black channel catfish and rainbow trout.
 Mountain biking is allowed around the lake and in the  park.
 Hiking is popular in the  park that connects Lake Desire and Spring Lake. The park includes part of Cedar Mountain with an  elevation according to the Washington Trails Association.

References

Desire
Desire
Parks in King County, Washington